Söhüb (also, Sukhyub, Syugyub, and Syukhyub) is a village and municipality in the Quba Rayon of Azerbaijan.  It has a population of 993.  The municipality consists of the villages of Söhüb and Rük.

References

External links

Populated places in Quba District (Azerbaijan)